Tandem skydiving or tandem parachuting refers to a type of skydiving where a student skydiver is connected to an instructor via a harness. The instructor guides the student through the whole jump from exit through freefall, piloting the canopy, and landing.  The student needs only minimal instruction before making a tandem jump with the instructor. In the United States most skydiving centers and clubs require that you be 18 years or older to skydive whereas in other countries the minimum age can be lower or higher. This is one of three commonly used training methods for beginning skydivers; the others being Static line, Instructor-assisted deployment (IAD), and Accelerated freefall (AFF) (k).

Tandem skydiving is a very popular training method for first time skydivers, but it is more expensive than a static line.  It exposes first-time jumpers to skydiving with minimal expectations from the student. The training may consist of many of the activities performed by any skydiving student, for example, how to exit the aircraft, how to do maneuvers in freefall, and how to deploy the main canopy themselves.  However, the tandem master remains primarily responsible for safe and timely [parachute] deployment. Tandem skydiving is very safe, with a student fatality rate of one per 500,000 tandem jumps over the past ten years.

Although it is the exception, many have commented that during a tandem skydive they experienced nausea and the feeling of passing out, which starts after the canopy deployment and goes away immediately after landing.  It is believed to be caused primarily by the incorrect adjustment of the tandem harness affecting blood flow. This rarely occurs with a solo harness and is more likely if the individual is at the upper end of the weight limit.

Equipment
Tandem skydiving requires equipment with several differences from normal sport skydiving rigs. All modern tandem skydiving systems use a drogue parachute, which is deployed shortly after leaving the plane in order to decrease the skydivers' terminal velocity. This is necessary for proper parachute deployment, lengthening the duration of the skydive, and allowing the skydivers to fall at the same speed as videographers. Tandem skydiving systems also use larger main parachutes (360 square feet and larger) to support the additional weight of two passengers. The FAA requires tandem parachute rigs to be equipped with a main and reserve parachute, as well as an automatic activation device (AAD), a safety device that automatically deploys the reserve parachute if it detects that the skydivers are still at freefall speed below a certain altitude.

Instructor certification
Most countries have varying laws or regulations regarding who may skydive with a passenger or student. In the United States, the FAA requires that every potential instructor have at least 3 years of experience skydiving, 500 skydives, and a master parachute license issued by an FAA-recognized organization (for the United States Parachute Association, this is equivalent to a D license).  Per USPA rules, instructors are also required to pass a certification course given by the manufacturer of the tandem parachute system to be jumped. The USPA also requires potential instructors to possess a current FAA Class III Medical Certificate, and complete a USPA Tandem Instructor Rating Course, although neither are required from the FAA directly. However, the FAA does state that the USPA is the only authorized parachuting agency in the United States authorized to certify a skydiver as a master parachute operator, and therefore a lack of compliance with USPA requirements regarding class III medical certificates or other USPA-sanctioned Tandem Instructor requirements would yield an instructor ineligible to serve as a tandem instructor in the United States.

References

External links

 
 United States Parachute Association (( https://uspa.org ))

Parachuting